The 2003 Special Olympics World Summer Games were hosted in Dublin Ireland, with participants staying in various host towns around the island in the lead up to the games before moving to Dublin for the events. Events were held from 21 to 29 June 2003 at many venues including Morton Stadium, the Royal Dublin Society, the National Basketball Arena, all in Dublin. Croke Park served as the central stadium for the opening and closing ceremonies, even though no competitions took place there. Belfast, Northern Ireland was the venue for roller skating events (at the Kings Hall), as well as the Special Olympics Scientific Symposium (held from 19 to 20 June).

The Games

The 2003 World Games were the first to be held outside of the United States. This was the largest sporting event held in 2003.

Opening ceremony
The opening ceremony was held in Croke Park featured an array of stars and was hosted by Patrick Kielty. The band U2 were a major feature, and Nelson Mandela officially opened the games.  Other performances included The Corrs and the largest Riverdance troupe ever assembled on one stage.  75,000 athletes and spectators were in attendance at the opening ceremonies.  Irish and international celebrities such as Arnold Schwarzenegger and Jon Bon Jovi walked with the athletes, with Muhammad Ali as a special guest and Manchester United and Republic of Ireland football player Roy Keane taking the athletes oath with one of the Special Olympians.

The Games Flame was lit at the culmination of the Law Enforcement Torch Run, which more than 2,000 members of the Garda Síochána (Irish Police) and the Police Service of Northern Ireland took part in. This was a series of relays carrying the Special Olympics Torch, the "Flame of Hope", from Europe to the Games' official opening.

The ceremony was officially opened by President of Ireland Mary McAleese and attended by Taoiseach (Prime Minister of Ireland) Bertie Ahern.

Organisation
The organising committee, which was formed in 1999 following the success of the bid, was chaired by entrepreneur Denis O'Brien. The chief executive was Mary Davis.

The 2003 games were the first to have their opening and closing schemes broadcast on live television, and Radio Telefís Éireann provided extensive coverage of the events through their 'Voice of the Games' radio station which replaced RTÉ Radio 1 on Medium Wave for the duration of the event. There was also a nightly television highlight programme.

Among the activities carried out during the Games were thorough medical checks on the athletes, some of whom had previously undiagnosed conditions uncovered, as some of the athletes came from countries with limited medical facilities or had difficulty communicating their symptoms.

A daily newspaper, the Games Gazette was published for each day of the games.

Among the contributors to the Games was the Irish Prison Service. Prisoners in Mountjoy Prison, Midlands Prison, Wheatfield Prison and Arbour Hill Prison who constructed podiums and made flags, towels, signs, benches and other equipment.

Volunteer programme
30,000 volunteer officials and support staff assisted in the running of the games, including 900 staff of the Bank of Ireland who coordinated the host town programme and 800 members of the Irish Defence Forces who maintained the radio communication network, and provided support for bridge building, security duties, VIP drivers, standard bearers for ceremonial events. The Irish Red Cross, Order of Malta and St. Johns Ambulance Brigade Ireland provided emergency medical teams at the event sites. Approximately 1,300 members of both Scouting Ireland (CSI) and Scouting Ireland SAI staffed the Awards Teams for all the disciplines throughout the games. 165 volunteers from the then 15 countries of the EU took part in a European Volunteer Project (EVS), the first ever to be organized in event-related mode.  The volunteers are commemorated by having their names on a series of plaques situated in Dublin Castle, just outside the Chester Beatty Library.

Participating teams
Approximately 6500 athletes from 166 countries competed in the games in 18 official disciplines, and three exhibition sports. The participants from Kosovo were the region's first team at an international sporting event.  A 12-member team from Iraq received special permission to attend the games, despite ongoing war in their home nation. Ireland was represented by an all-island team with athletes from both the Republic of Ireland and Northern Ireland. Athletes from Taiwan competed under the name "Chinese Taipei". Athletes from the United States were grouped into eight regional teams; Great Lakes, Mid Atlantic, New England, North Central, North West, South Central, South East, South West.

The following teams participated, grouped by Special Olympics regions:

Africa

Asia Pacific

 (Bharat)

 (Nippon)

 (Nepa)

 (Pilipinas)

East Asia

 Chinese Taipei

 (Korea)

Europe and Eurasia

	

	

	

	
 Great Britain	
 (Hellas)

 Ireland (Host)
	
	

	
 Kosovo	

	

	
 FYR Macedonia	

	
	

	

 (Türkiye)

Latin Amierca

	

	

	

Middle East and North Africa

	

	

	
	

North America

Host town programme
177 towns, cities and villages and the Aran Islands hosted national delegations in the run up to the games.  Each town ran programmes to educate the local community about the customs of the country they would host and provided facilities for the teams to acclimatise.  Newbridge, County Kildare, host to the Japan delegation won the award for best host town.

Events
Athletes and coaches such as Lleyton Hewitt and his coach Roger Rasheed (tennis); Seve Ballesteros, Sandy Lyle and Andrew Marshall (golf), Mick O'Dwyer (Gaelic football) and Brian Kerr (soccer) met and encouraged athletes at events during the games.

Events and venues were:

 Aquatics  — National Aquatic Centre, Blanchardstown
 Athletics (track and field) — Morton Stadium, Santry
 Badminton — Badminton Centre, Baldoyle
 Basketball — National Basketball Arena, Tallaght; University College Dublin (UCD), Belfield
 Bocce — Royal Dublin Society (RDS), Ballsbridge
 Bowling — Leisureplex, Blanchardstown
 Cycling — Phoenix Park
 Equestrian — Kill Equestrian Centre, Kill, County Kildare
 Football (soccer) — Athletic Union League Clonshaugh; UCD
 Golf — Portmarnock GC; Elm Green GC, Dunsink
 Gymnastics (artistic and rhythmic) — RDS
 Judo — Sportslink, Santry
 Kayaking — Salmon Leap Canoe Club, Leixlip
 Motor Activity Training Program — RDS
 Pitch and putt — Glenville Pitch & Putt, Old Bawn
 Powerlifting — RDS
 Roller skating — King's Hall, Belfast
 Sailing — Royal St. George Yacht Club, Dún Laoghaire
 Table tennis — RDS
 Team handball — National Show Centre, Cloghran
 Tennis — David Lloyd Riverview, Clonskeagh
 Volleyball — ALSAA, Dublin Airport; Dublin City University, Glasnevin

References

Sources

Citations

External links
 2003 World Games official website (Archived)
 Official list of nations and athletes
 Host Town list
 Special Olympics 2003 Results
 Irish Prison Service release on their inmates work for the Special Olympics
 Special Olympics Ireland website

2003
2003 in Irish sport
2003 in multi-sport events
International sports competitions in Dublin (city)
International sports competitions hosted by Ireland
Multi-sport events in Ireland
2000s in Dublin (city)